Heitor Villa-Lobos's Étude No. 7, one of his Twelve Études for Guitar, was first published by Max Eschig, Paris, in 1953.

History
The first public performance of this étude (together with those of Études 1 and 8) was given by Andrés Segovia on 5 March 1947 at Wellesley College in Wellesley, Massachusetts..

Structure
The piece is in E major and is marked Très animé.

Analysis
Étude No. 7 is a study, first in rapid scales, then a section of arpeggios supporting a lyrical melody played entirely on the first string, and a return to the scales, creating a ternary (ABA) form.

References

Cited sources

Further reading
 Wright, Simon. 1992. Villa-Lobos. Oxford Studies of Composers. Oxford and New York: Oxford University Press.  (cloth);  (pbk).

Compositions by Heitor Villa-Lobos
Guitar études
Compositions in E major